Henry Hellyer was an explorer in north west Tasmania during the 1820s.

Places in the region named after him include:
Hellyer Gorge
Hellyer College, college in Tasmania, Australia
 Hellyer County Park
Hellyer Park Velodrome, a velodrome in Hellyer County Park
 Hellyer River

Other notable people named Hellyer include:
Albert Hellyer (died 1945), Canadian politician
Arthur Hellyer (1902–1993), British horticulturist
Arthur Lawrence Hellyer Jr. (1923–2018), radio host
H. A. Hellyer, British academic and author on European affairs and relations with the Muslim world
Jill Hellyer (1925–2012), Australian poet and writer
Paul Hellyer (1923–2021), Canadian politician and Minister of National Defence
Thomas Hellyer (1840–1889), 19th-century Australian politician
Thomas Hellyer (architect) (1811–1894), 19th-century English architect
William Hellyer (died 1885), Australian politician